Rhopaloblaste singaporensis is a species of flowering plant in the family Arecaceae. It is found in Malaysia and Singapore. It is threatened by habitat loss.

References

singaporensis
Flora of Malaya
Conservation dependent plants
Taxonomy articles created by Polbot
Taxa named by George Bentham
Taxa named by Joseph Dalton Hooker